Lincoln Township is a township in O'Brien County, Iowa, United States.

Geography 
Lincoln Township is bordered by Hartley Township on the east, Franklin Township to the west, Center Township to the south, and Osceola County, Iowa to the north. Its total area is 35.5 square miles, and its elevation is 1,530 feet. Floyd River runs through the township, and Waterman Creek is the main drainage outlet.

Demographics 
As of the 2020 census, the population of Lincoln Township was 195. Of those, 189 were white, one was black, one was some other race, and four were two or more races. As of the 2019 American Community Survey, eight residents were Hispanic or Latino of any race.

History 
Lincoln Township was formed out of part of Waterman Township after its population grew and it became necessary to divide the township. House File 390, which officially established Lincoln Township, was passed by the Iowa House of Representatives in 1886. The first settlers moved to Lincoln Township from Hardin County, Iowa, in 1870. In 1881, the population of the township was 36; in 1885, 53; and in 1914, around 185. A branch of the Burlington, Cedar Rapids and Northern Railway used to run through the northwest part of the township, with a station at Plessis.

Government 
Lincoln Township is represented in the United States House of Representatives by Republican Randy Feenstra of Iowa's 4th congressional district. It is represented in the Iowa Senate by Republican Randy Feenstra of District 2, and in the Iowa House of Representatives by Republican Daniel Adair Huseman of District 3. In the O'Brien County Board of Supervisors, Lincoln Township is represented by Sherri Bootsma of District 1.

Education 
Lincoln Township is in the Hartley–Melvin–Sanborn Community School District.

References 

Townships in O'Brien County, Iowa
Townships in Iowa